Giacomo Manzù, pseudonym of Giacomo Manzoni (22 December 1908 – 17 January 1991), was an Italian sculptor.

Biography

Manzù was born in Bergamo. His father was a shoemaker. Other than a few evening art classes, he was self-taught in sculpture, and later became a professor himself. He started working with wood during his military service in Veneto in 1928; later, after a short stay in Paris, he moved to Milan, where architect Giovanni Muzio commissioned him the decoration of the chapel of Università Cattolica del Sacro Cuore (1931–1932). In 1933 he exhibited a series of busts at the Triennale di Milano,  which granted him national popularity. The following year he held a personal exhibition in Rome with the painter Aligi Sassu, with whom he shared a studio.

In 1939 Manzù started a series of bronze bas-reliefs about the death of Jesus Christ; the works, exhibited in Rome in 1942, were criticized by the Fascist government and the ecclesiastical authorities. In 1940 he obtained a teaching position in the Accademia di Brera in Milan, but later he moved to the Accademia Albertina in Turin. During World War II Manzù moved to Clusone, returning to teach at Brera after the end of the conflict. He held his teaching position until 1954 when he moved to Salzburg, where he lived until 1960. Here he met Inge Schabel, his future wife, who was the model of a large number of his portraits together with her sister Sonja. He was commissioned in 1957 to design the central doors for Salzburg Cathedral, completed in bronze in 1959. In 1964 he completed the "Death Gate" for the St. Peter's Basilica in Rome. In the same year he moved to Ardea, near Rome, in a locality now rechristened Colle Manzù in his honor.

He created two sculptures in stiacciato at Rockefeller Center on the former Italian building in the 1960's, one titled "The Immigrant" and the other "A Fruitful Harvest". 

In the late 1960s Manzù started to work also as scenographer. In 1977 he completed a "Monument to the Partisan" in Bergamo. His last great work was the 6 m-tall sculpture facing the ONU seat in New York City, inaugurated in 1989.

He was the subject of a famous photographic portrait by Yousuf Karsh.

His works are displayed in prestigious museums and private collections. Although he was an atheist, he was a personal friend of Pope John XXIII and had important liturgical commissions for the Vatican. In the United States, architect Minoru Yamasaki commissioned him the Passo di Danza (dance step) sculpture at the One Woodward Avenue building in Detroit. He also carved the Nymph and Faun at Wayne State University's McGreagor Memorial Sculpture Garden.

Manzù died in Rome in 1991.

Awards
 Gold medal: Italian Order of Merit for Culture and Art (1981)
Lenin Peace Prize (1965)
 Knighthood: Order of Merit of the Italian Republic (1960)

References

Sources

External links

Masters of 20th Century Figure Sculpture
Door of Death in St Peter's
 Antonella Crippa, Giacomo Manzù, online catalogue Artgate by Fondazione Cariplo, 2010, CC BY-SA.

1908 births
1991 deaths
Artists from Bergamo
Italian atheists
Italian contemporary artists
Italian communists
Lenin Peace Prize recipients
Academic staff of Brera Academy
Academic staff of Accademia Albertina
Recipients of the Order of Merit of the Italian Republic
20th-century Italian sculptors
20th-century male artists
Italian male sculptors
Honorary Members of the Royal Academy